The electoral division of Rosevears is one of the 15 electorates or 'seats' in the Tasmanian upper house. The division is located on the west side of the Tamar River. It is named after the town of Rosevears which is located on the river banks near Exeter.

The electoral boundaries include the towns of Exeter, Rowella, Sidmouth, Legana, Bridgenorth, Gravelly Beach, Greens Beach, Beaconsfield, Glengarry, Beauty point and Clarence point. The division also includes the Launceston suburbs of West Launceston, Riverside, Summerhill, Trevallyn and Glen Dhu.

The current sitting member for Rosevears is Liberal member Jo Palmer who has held the seat since 2020. The next election in Rosevears is due in 2026. The number of enrolled electors in the division was 27,503 in July 2020.

History

The division was created in 1999 after a reduction in the size of parliament. Rosevears includes most localities from the former Division of Cornwall. Localities in the West Tamar region that were once a part of the Division of Roland were also added into Rosevears. The division also acquired suburbs from the abolished Division of Launceston.

When the electorate was created; Ray Bailey who was the member for Cornwall was automatically made member for Rosevears. In the first election, held in 2002, he retired and Kerry Finch was elected instead. This election had a low voter turnout, despite voting being compulsory, which was attributed to confusion as to which electorate people were located in.

Members

See also

 Tasmanian House of Assembly

References

External links
Parliament of Tasmania
Tasmanian Electoral Commission - Legislative Council

Rosevears
Northern Tasmania